A number of ships have been named Kaiwo Maru, including:

 
 

Ship names